2ce may refer to:
 2C-E, a psychedelic phenethylamine 
AD 2, the year also referred to as 2 CE